Muhammad Akram Cheema is a Pakistani politician who has been a member of the National Assembly of Pakistan since August 2018.

Political career
He was elected to the National Assembly of Pakistan from Constituency NA-239 (Korangi Karachi-I) as a candidate of Pakistan Tehreek-e-Insaf in 2018 Pakistani general election.

Resignation
On April 10, 2022, because of the regime change of Imran Khan's government, he resigned from the National Assembly on the orders of Imran Khan. The new government did not accept the resignations of many members for fear of deteriorating the number of members. However, accepting the resignations of eleven members on July 28, 2022, one of them was Akram Cheema. Later, by-elections were held again on his seat, Imran Khan made a surprising move to stand on his own in all the by-seats.

External Link

More Reading
 List of members of the 15th National Assembly of Pakistan

References

Living people
Pakistani MNAs 2018–2023
Year of birth missing (living people)